On 21 May 2016, Akhtar Mansour was killed in a U.S. military drone strike on the N-40 National Highway in Pakistan near Ahmad Wal, not far from the Pakistan–Afghanistan border; Mansour had crossed earlier that day from Iran into Pakistan through the Taftan, Balochistan, border crossing, some  away from the spot where he was killed.

The following day, U.S. Secretary of State John Kerry announced that the United States had "conducted a precision airstrike that targeted Taliban leader Mullah Mansour in a remote area of the Afghanistan–Pakistan border" against Mansour that had likely killed him, and stated that Mansour "posed a continuing, imminent threat" to U.S. personnel and Afghans.

On 23 May 2016, U.S. President Barack Obama confirmed that Mansour had been killed in the American airstrike that he had sanctioned, and stated that Mansour had been planning attacks against U.S. targets in Kabul. Obama stated afterwards that he had hoped Mansour's death would lead to the Taliban joining a peace process. The death of Mansour was also later officially confirmed separately by the Afghan government and members of the Taliban.

Incident 
Mansour had crossed into Pakistan posing as a Pakistani citizen, using forged identity documents (a Pakistani passport and national ID card under the name "Muhammad Wali.") The false passport showed that Mansour had entered Iran on 28 March. Mansour and his taxi driver were both killed in the strike against the Toyota Corolla, which was struck by two Hellfire missiles launched by Reaper drones that had evaded Pakistani radar.

Succession and impact 
Mansour was succeeded as Taliban leader by Hibatullah Akhundzada.

Some U.S. officials had been divided over Mansour's intentions. Some believed that Mansour could have brought the Taliban to the negotiating table, potentially speeding up the reconciliation process; others, by contrast, "were highly skeptical of Mansour's commitment to talks," noting that Mansour had a long history of authorizing suicide attacks, including in the weeks before the drone strike (such as the April 2016 Kabul attack, which killed more than 60 people), and that even as Mansour was agreeing to secret direct peace negotiations, he had rejected international peace efforts. According to the International Institute for Counter-Terrorism, U.S. officials stated that Mullah Mansour's death was "unavoidable" due to the then Emir being unwilling to engage in peace talks.

References 

2016 airstrikes
Airstrikes during the War in Afghanistan (2001–2021)
Mansour, Akhtar